Club Deportivo California  is a Salvadoran professional football club based in California, Usulutan,  El Salvador.

The club currently plays in the Tercera Division de Fútbol Salvadoreño. 

The club was founded in 1980.

Current squad

List of Coaches
  Elías Ramírez (2016)

References

Football clubs in El Salvador